Erich Graber was an Italian luger who competed from the mid-1960s to the early 1980s. A natural track luger, he won two medals in the men's singles event at the FIL World Luge Natural Track Championships (Gold: 1980, Bronze: 1979).

Graber also was successful in the FIL European Luge Natural Track Championships with nine medals, including five golds (Singles: 1974, 1975, 1977; Doubles: 1977, 1981), three silvers (Singles: 1975, Doubles: 1970, 1974), and one bronze (Doubles: 1979).

Graber also won a bronze in the men's singles event at the 1965 FIL World Luge Championships in Davos, Switzerland (Note: The first natural track championships in Europe did not occur until 1970 while the first natural track world championships did not occur until 1979. The first permanent artificially refrigerated bobsleigh, luge, or skeleton track was not constructed until 1969.).

References
Natural track European Championships results 1970-2006.
Natural track World Championships results: 1979-2007
Hickok sports information on World champions in luge and skeleton.

Italian lugers
Italian male lugers
Possibly living people
Year of birth missing
Sportspeople from Südtirol